Pieter Hopmans (born 22 Aug 1865 in Standdaarbuiten) was a Dutch clergyman and bishop for the Roman Catholic Diocese of Breda. He was ordained in 1890. He was appointed in 1914. He died in 1951.

References 

Dutch Roman Catholic bishops
1865 births
1951 deaths